Aadha Ishq is an Indian romantic drama web series produced by Bhairavi Raichura under the banner of 24 Frames Media. It features Aamna Sharif, Gaurav Arora and Pratibha Ranta. The series released on 12 May 2022 on streaming platform Voot Select.

Cast

Main 
 Gaurav Arora as Saahir Singh – Roma and Rene's love interest
 Aamna Sharif as Roma Bhardwaj – Milind's ex-wife, Aman and Sahir's ex-girlfriend
 Pratibha Ranta as Rene Bhardwaj – Milind and Roma's daughter, Jass's ex-girlfriend

Recurring 
 Kunaal Roy Kapur as Milind – Roma's ex-husband, Samaira's husband, Rene's father
 Gautam Ahuja as Andy – Karen's son, Rene's best friend and supporter
 Darsheel Safary as Jass – Rene's ex-boyfriend
 Pooja Bhamrrah as Samaira 'Sam' – Milind's wife, Rene's step-mother
 Suchitra Pillai as Karanjit 'Karen' Kaur – Roma's best friend and supporter
 Vishal Karwal as Aman – Roma's ex-boyfriend
 Geeta Tyagi as Saahir's mother

Episodes

References

2022 web series debuts
Hindi-language web series
Indian drama web series